Forest Park is a park in the New York City borough of Queens, spanning . It is the tenth-largest park in New York City and the third-largest in Queens. Created on August 9, 1895, it was originally referred to as Brooklyn Forest Park, as the area was part of Brooklyn at the time.

The park contains  of trees, including the largest continuous oak forest in Queens. Some trees are more than a century and a half old. The park sits on hills left behind by the Wisconsin glacier and is a haven for native plants and wildlife in the midst of the city's sprawl. In addition to the park's large full-time bird population, migratory birds pass through in the spring and fall.

Several trails are available for area residents and urban day hikers. Other facilities include playgrounds, a carousel, a running track, two dog runs, a pond, tennis courts, basketball courts, baseball fields, a skate park, and a golf course. The park is operated and maintained by the New York City Department of Parks and Recreation.

History

Early development

The Wisconsinian glaciation molded this land between 20,000 and 10,000 years ago and left the Harbor Hill Moraine, a series of small hills known as “knob and kettle” terrain, including Forest Park. The land was inhabited by the Rockaway, Lenape, and Delaware Native Americans when the Dutch West India Company settled the area in 1635.

The site of Forest Park was occupied by various landowners until the late 19th century, when City of Brooklyn officials looked for land for a large public park. In 1892, the New York State Legislature authorized the park search, and the Brooklyn Parks Department purchased the first parcel of this space on August 9, 1895, whereupon the name Brooklyn Forest Park was first used. Because of the numerous private landowners involved, the park had to be assembled in 124 parcels, finishing in 1898. James S. T. Stranahan, the onetime President of the Brooklyn Board of Park Commissioners, originally envisioned one large park extending eastward to Jamaica, Queens and westward to Park Slope, Brooklyn. However, the city's rapid development made this impossible, and today, the largest remnants of this proposed landscape are Forest Park and the  Prospect Park in Brooklyn.

Starting in 1896, the landscaping firm of Olmsted, Olmsted & Eliot was contracted to provide a plan for the park. Frederick Law Olmsted surveyed the park and designed Forest Park Drive. Existing residential buildings were auctioned and disassembled and removed. A nine-hole golf course opened in 1901. Its club house, which was designed in the Dutch Colonial Revival style by the firm of Helmle, Huberty & Hudswell (who also designed the Williamsburgh Savings Bank Tower), and which now houses the park's Administration Office, first opened in 1905.

Carousels designed by Daniel Muller were added in 1918; one of them was destroyed by fire in 1966, and the other in 1972. Jackson Pond was used for fishing and ice skating, but was filled in for redevelopment.

Recent development
During the park's centennial celebration in 1995, 100 trees were planted as a part of Operation Pine Grove, funded by American Forests and the Texaco Global Re-leaf Program. Parks uses the greenhouse, built in 1910, to grow trees and plants for many other city parks. In addition, the kettle ponds in the forest provide a haven for bird watching. Forest Park Drive between the Bandshell and the entrance to the Jackie Robinson Parkway rides along the top of the glacial moraine.

A number of the parks' trees were destroyed in Hurricane Sandy and one fallen tree damaged the structure housing the Forest Park Carousel, but the damage was repaired and the carousel reopened in March 2013.  The Forest Park Carousel was listed on the National Register of Historic Places in 2004.

Features

Recreation and events 

Within Forest Park is "The Overlook", the administration building for Queens Parks, and "Oak Ridge", the former golf-course clubhouse and current administration building for Forest Park. Forest Park also offers a wide array of recreational facilities, the Carousel, playgrounds, a pond, a barbecue area, the George Seuffert Sr. Bandshell, a nature center, and two dog runs. Dogs can run off leash here, and there is a separate area for small dogs. Therapeutic horseback riding for people with special needs is also available in the park.

Annual events such as the Halloween Walk, the Victorian Christmas, Nature Trails Day, orienteering and battle re-enactments draw the participation of the surrounding neighborhoods of Kew Gardens, Woodhaven, Richmond Hill, Forest Hills, and Glendale.

Landscape features 
Strack Pond is a glacial kettle pond located inside the park near Woodhaven Boulevard and Forest Park Drive. The pond, named after a local resident killed in the Vietnam War, was buried in 1966 and restored four decades later.

Wildlife and vegetation 
 Birds common to Forest Park include red-tailed hawks, a variety of woodpeckers, great blue herons, mallards, northern orioles, American kestrels, ruby throated hummingbirds, ring-necked pheasants, northern flickers, eastern wood pewees, tufted titmice, white-breasted nuthatches, wood thrushes, red-eyed vireos, red-winged blackbirds, scarlet tanagers, and several species of sparrow including rufous-sided towhees. A great variety of warblers often pass through in the spring. According to the New York City Parks Department, more than 100 species of migratory birds visit the park each year.

Chipmunks become visibly active in spring, along with the squirrels, raccoons, and skunks that are more often seen year-round. Turtles sun themselves in Strack Pond on warm days. On summer nights, cicada song fills the area and surrounding neighborhoods. Toads also can be heard croaking in the evenings. In mid-summer, hatching butterflies begin to gravitate to the Joe Pye Weed, dogbane, milkweed, thistle, and other native plants. Fall brings spectacular color, as many varieties of trees prepare to drop their leaves. Several species of hawks pass through. Winter is quiet, featuring the occasional tracks of small mammals in snow.

Forest Park's trees include the Northern red oak (Quercus rubra), Scarlet oak (Quercus coccinea), Tulip tree (Liriodendron tulipifera), Shagbark hickory (Carya ovata), White oak (Quercus alba), American beech (Fagus grandifolia), American sweetgum (Liquidambar styraciflua), and Black cherry (Prunus serotina). Several trees in the park are more than 150 years old, and create a canopy with an under-layer of Dogwood (Cornus), Virginia creeper (Parthenocissus quinquefolia), Sassafras (Sassafras albidum), and Corktree (Genus Phellodendron). Wildflowers such as white wood aster cover the forest floor in spring, as the azaleas, dogwoods, forsythia, and other flowering plants begin to bloom.

The park was ravaged in 1912 by the chestnut blight, and for a time was used for lumbering; about the same time, greenhouses were set up to grow plants for parks throughout the city. These have since been moved to the Brooklyn Botanic Garden and Bronx Park.

Transportation

Public transport 
Forest Park is accessible by the IND Queens Boulevard Line of the New York City Subway at Kew Gardens–Union Turnpike. The southern part of the park is accessible via the BMT Jamaica Line at 75th Street–Elderts Lane, 85th Street–Forest Parkway, and Woodhaven Boulevard.

The Q56 bus runs just south of the park along Jamaica Avenue and the Q11, Q21, Q52 SBS, and Q53 SBS routes run along Woodhaven Boulevard. The Q37 runs along Park Lane South in Kew Gardens and Richmond Hill, while the Q55 bus is straddled by the park along Myrtle Avenue.

Other 
In 1895, Olmsted observed that two lines of the Long Island Rail Road—the Montauk Branch and the Rockaway Beach Branch—had run through the land before Forest Park was acquired. Of these, only the Montauk Branch still sees any train service. Forest Park is also divided by Woodhaven Boulevard and the Jackie Robinson Parkway (formerly Interboro Parkway), which was completed in 1935. Despite these thoroughfares, Forest Park is the third-largest park in Queens, and contains the largest continuous oak forest in Queens and a  golf course. Forest Park is bounded by Myrtle Avenue, Union Turnpike, Park Lane, Park Lane South and Cypress Hills Cemetery.

The Brooklyn-Queens Greenway bike path also runs through Forest Park, connecting westward to Ridgewood Reservoir and eastward to Kew Gardens.

References

External links 

 New York City Department of Parks and Recreation

Parks in Queens, New York
Urban forests in the United States
Forest parks in the United States
Urban public parks
Woodhaven, Queens
Forest Hills, Queens
Kew Gardens, Queens
Richmond Hill, Queens
Nature centers in New York City